Microgaster godzilla is a species of aquatic parasitoid wasp from Japan. Its host is the caterpillar Elophila turbata. The wasp is named after  Godzilla (1954 film).

References

Microgastrinae